Dunasor is a district of Dunaújváros, Hungary. It is located between Városháza tér and the hospital. It is bordered by Streets Kossuth Lajos utca Vasmű, Kohász, Duna sor and Panoráma.

Sources
 Dunaújvárosi Köztéri Szobrai, Várnai Gyula - Gyöngyössy Csaba, 1999, Ma Kiadó,  
 Dunapentele Sztálinváros, Dunaújváros Numizmatikai Emlékei 1950-2010, Asztalos Andrásné,

External links
 Dunaújváros Dunasor

Dunaújváros